Kevin Marsh is a British Malariologist, academic and a researcher. He is a Professor of Tropical Medicine and Director of Africa Oxford Initiative at University of Oxford. He is also a senior advisor at African Academy of Sciences.

Marsh has authored around 500 research publications on malarial immunity and pathogenesis. His research is focused in clinical, epidemiological and immunological aspects of malaria. He has also conducted extensive work on developing and strengthening scientific research in Africa.

Marsh chaired the WHO Malaria Policy Advisory Committee from 2012 till 2019 and is a member of numerous international committees relating to malaria and to global health research. He is a Fellow of St Cross College and a Fellow of the Royal College of Physicians, Royal Society of Tropical Medicine and Hygiene, Academy of Medical Sciences, European Academy of Sciences and Arts, African Academy of Sciences and World Academy of Sciences.

Education
Marsh completed his Bachelor of Medicine and Bachelor of Surgery Degree in 1978 from Liverpool University. He received his post graduate diploma in Tropical Medicine and Hygiene in 1982 from Liverpool.

Career
Marsh initiated his research career at the Medical Research Council Unit in the Gambia, where he worked on the immunology of malaria. From 1985 till 1989, he was at the Institute of Molecular Medicine in Oxford. In 1989, he, along with his colleagues, established a series of research projects on the immunology and clinical epidemiology of malaria at Kilifi on the coast of Kenya; these developed into an international programme, the KEMRI Wellcome Trust Research Programme, which he directed until 2014. Marsh has been a Professor of Tropical Medicine in Nuffield Department of Medicine at the University of Oxford since 1994 and is currently Director of Africa Oxford Initiative.

Since 2014 Marsh has been senior adviser at the African Academy of sciences, based at their headquarters in Nairobi, where he worked with colleagues to develop the Alliance for Accelerating Excellence in Science in  Africa (AESA), a platform aiming to shift the centre of gravity of research to the African continent. He currently co leads the AAS Covid programme which has worked closely with AUDA NEPAD, Africa CDC and WHO Afro to develop COVID-19 research priorities for the continent.

Research
Marsh's research expertise lies in malaria, malaria vaccines, tropical medicine, and child health in Africa. He has conducted research on epidemiological, clinical and immunological aspects of malaria.

Awards and honors
1987 - Unilever Research Fellowship, Green College Oxford 
1994 - Chalmers Medal, Royal Society of Tropical Medicine and Hygiene
2004 - Ronald Ross Medal, London School of Hygiene & Tropical Medicine 
2004 - Fellowship, Academy of Medical Science
2008 - Gijs Van Seventer medal, University of Boston 
2010 - Honorary life member, Australasian Society of Infectious Diseases
2010 - Prince Mahidol Award for Medicine
2012 - Honorary life member, American Society Tropical Medicine and Hygiene
2012 - Fellowship, Royal Society of Biology
2015 - Mary Kingsley Medal, Liverpool School of Tropical Medicine
2015 - Fellowship, African Academy of Sciences
2016 - Al Sumait prize for African development
2017 - EMBL lifetime achievement award for research on malaria
2017 - Drexel Prize for Infectious Diseases
2018 - Elected to the European Academy of Sciences and Arts
2019 - Fellow, World Academy of Sciences

References 

1954 births
Living people
Alumni of the University of Liverpool
Fellows of the African Academy of Sciences
Associate Fellows of the African Academy of Sciences
TWAS fellows